Frederick Debartzch Monk,  (April 6, 1856 – May 15, 1914) was a Canadian lawyer and politician.

Born in Montreal, Quebec, Monk was the son of The Hon. Mr Justice Samuel Cornwallis Monk (1814–1888) and Rosalie Caroline Debartzch (1819–1889), daughter of The Hon. Pierre-Dominique Debartzch. His grandmother, Anne (Gugy) Monk was a daughter of Col. The Hon. Louis Gugy. He received a Bachelor of Civil Law degree in 1877 from McGill University and was called to the Quebec Bar in 1878. From 1888 to 1914, he taught in the faculty of law at the Université Laval. In 1893, he was made a Queen's Counsel.

Monk was first elected to the House of Commons of Canada in 1896 as a Conservative Member of Parliament for the riding of Jacques Cartier. He was re-elected in 1900, 1904, 1908, and 1911. He resigned from Cabinet on October 28, 1912, after disagreeing with Sir Robert Borden over the refusal of a referendum on Canadian purchase of three dreadnought class ships for Laurier's "Tin Pot Navy."  From 1911 to 1912, he was the Minister of Public Works. Monk continued as a backbench MP, though his relations with the Conservative Party were increasingly strained, until March 2, 1914, when he resigned from the House of Commons due to ill health. He died two months later and was entombed at the Notre Dame des Neiges Cemetery in Montreal.

His son, Frederick Arthur Monk, was a member of the Legislative Assembly of Quebec from 1935 to 1936.

By-election: On Mr. Monk being appointed Minister of Public Works, 10 October 1911

Archives 
There is a Frederick Debartzch Monk fonds at Library and Archives Canada.

References

External links 
 
 

1856 births
1914 deaths
Canadian people of Polish descent
Canadian legal scholars
Conservative Party of Canada (1867–1942) MPs
McGill University Faculty of Law alumni
Members of the House of Commons of Canada from Quebec
Members of the King's Privy Council for Canada
Politicians from Montreal
Academic staff of Université Laval
Canadian King's Counsel
Burials at Notre Dame des Neiges Cemetery